The United States District Court for the District of Minnesota (in case citations, D. Minn.)  is the federal district court whose jurisdiction is the state of Minnesota. Its two primary courthouses are in Minneapolis and Saint Paul. Cases are also heard in the federal courthouses of Duluth and Fergus Falls.

Appeals from the District of Minnesota are taken to the United States Court of Appeals for the Eighth Circuit (except for patent claims and claims against the U.S. government under the Tucker Act, which are appealed to the Federal Circuit).

United States Attorney  

The United States Attorney's Office for the District of Minnesota represents the United States in civil and criminal litigation in the court. One notable former U.S. Attorney for the District was Cushman K. Davis, who later became governor of the state and was elected to the United States Senate.

, the United States Attorney is Andrew M. Luger.

Current judges 
:

Vacancies and pending nominations

Former judges

Chief judges

Succession of seats

See also 
 Courts of Minnesota
 List of current United States district judges
 List of United States federal courthouses in Minnesota

References

External links 
 Official site
 United States Attorney for the District of Minnesota official site

Courthouses in Minnesota
Minnesota law
Minnesota
Minneapolis
Saint Paul, Minnesota
Duluth, Minnesota
Otter Tail County, Minnesota
1858 establishments in Minnesota
Courts and tribunals established in 1858